Wexford is an unincorporated community in Allegheny County, Pennsylvania. It is a suburb of the Pittsburgh metropolitan area, split amongst multiple municipalities, including Franklin Park, McCandless, Pine Township, and Marshall Township. It is named after County Wexford in Ireland.

Home to many upper-middle-class people, Wexford's commercial landscape is dominated by a mixture of corporate chains, car dealerships, and a number of local small businesses,  giving this small town much diversity.  Wexford concentrated on the main thoroughfare of the "Wexford Flats", U.S. Route 19.  It is also home to North Allegheny Senior High School, Pine-Richland High School, Eden Hall Upper Elementary School, Marshall Middle School, Eden Christian Academy, (Wexford) Elementary School, and Vincentian Academy.

It was ranked the twenty-eighth best place to live by Money magazine in 2005, despite it being essentially a postal zip code and a general descriptor of a section of the suburban Pittsburgh metropolitan area, not a municipality of any type.

Description
The presence of North Allegheny Senior High School, a large, well-funded public high school, the numerous businesses, and a number of churches along the "Wexford Flats" gives the area a more distinct community identity than simply an otherwise unremarkable suburb in the Greater Pittsburgh Area. Adjacent to Wexford is North Park and North Park lake. This area is a great asset to the community featuring many hiking/biking trails, a 5-mile paved running path around the lake, many pavilions for outdoor events, an outdoor ice rink, a golf course, dog parks, and many playgrounds, a C.O.P.E. course, and local restaurants and shops. The lake underwent construction, including dredging and refinishing shorelines, between 2009 and 2012.

The Wexford area is a growing community with subdivisions and neighborhoods constantly increasing. To account for the immense increase in population in the past few years and for years to come, the county ultimately expanded U.S. Route 19, the road that runs through the "flats", by adding a center turn lane.  Before its expansion, the road was four lanes (two each way), and heavy traffic caused significant problems for drivers attempting to perform left turns.

History
Unlike most of Allegheny County, Wexford was removed from area code 412 when it was subdivided in 1998, being placed in area code 724 instead. Part of this was because of Wexford's close proximity to Cranberry Township, one of the fastest-growing areas in the United States.

Notable people
 Christina Aguilera, Grammy award-winning singer, actress, and pop culture icon; lived in Wexford during her adolescence
 Charlie Batch, former professional football player, Detroit Lions and Pittsburgh Steelers 
 Bobby Grier, civil rights icon and Pittsburgh Panthers Hall of Famer
 James Harrison, Pittsburgh Steelers linebacker
 Jake Herbert, folkstyle and freestyle wrestler, 2009 World silver medalist, represented USA at 2012 Summer Olympics
 Cameron Heyward, Pittsburgh Steelers defensive end
 Cy Hungerford, longtime editorial cartoonist for the Pittsburgh Post-Gazette
 Meghan Klingenberg, 2015 FIFA Women's World Cup Champion, United States women's national soccer team defender
 Bradley C. Livezey, ornithologist at the Carnegie Museum of Natural History
 Jeffrey McLaughlin, rowing medalist at the 1988 and 1992 Olympics, Northeastern University Hall of Fame
 Frank Nicotero, comedian
 Dan Smyers, half of country duo Dan + Shay
 Mike Wagner, Super Bowl winning defensive back for the Pittsburgh Steelers
 Bob Walk, former Major League Baseball pitcher and long-time broadcast announcer for the Pittsburgh Pirates

References

External links
Unreal! Wexford Bounced from List

Unincorporated communities in Allegheny County, Pennsylvania
Unincorporated communities in Pennsylvania